KSAF-LP (104.1 FM) is a low power radio station licensed to True Light Broadcasting, Inc., a ministry of the Seventh-day Adventist Church in Minot, North Dakota. 
It airs a Christian radio format.

The station was assigned the KSAF-LP call letters by the Federal Communications Commission on March 26, 2004.

See also
Media ministries of the Seventh-day Adventist Church

References

External links
 True Light Broadcasting
 Minot Seventh-day Adventist Church website
 

SAF-LP
SAF-LP
SAF-LP